is a former Japanese football player.

Playing career
Oyama was born in Kagawa Prefecture on April 24, 1974. After graduating from high school, he joined Yamaha Motors (later Júbilo Iwata) in 1993. He played several matches as forward until 1995. However he got hurt in 1996 and he could not play at all in the match from 1996. He retired end of 1997 season.

Club statistics

References

External links

J.League

1974 births
Living people
Association football people from Kagawa Prefecture
Japanese footballers
J1 League players
Japan Football League (1992–1998) players
Júbilo Iwata players
Association football forwards